Kriti Kharbanda (born 29 October 1990) is an Indian actress who predominantly works in Kannada, Hindi and Telugu language films. After beginning her career as a model, she made her acting debut with the Telugu film Boni (2009) and her Kannada film debut with Chirru (2010).

Following few unsuccessful films, Kharbanda portrayed a medical student in Googly (2013), for which she received SIIMA Award for Best Actress - Kannada nomination, the leading lady in Super Ranga (2014), for which she won SIIMA Award for Best Actress (Critics) and received Filmfare Award for Best Actress – Kannada nomination. She portrayed an IAS Aspirant in Bruce Lee: The Fighter (2015), receiving Filmfare Award for Best Supporting Actress – Telugu and SIIMA Award for Best Supporting Actress – Telugu nominations. Her other successful films include the Kannada films, Tirupathi Express, Belli both (2014) and Minchagi Nee Baralu (2015).

Kharbanda made her Hindi film debut with Raaz: Reboot (2016) and played a PCS Officer in Shaadi Mein Zaroor Aana (2017). Her notable Hindi films include Yamla Pagla Deewana: Phir Se (2018), Housefull 4 (2019), which is her highest-grossing release, Taish (2020) and 14 Phere (2021). For Taish, she received ITA Award for Popular Actress - OTT nomination.

She is a recipient of a SIIMA Awards along with two Filmfare Awards South nominations. In addition to her acting career, Kharbanda is a prominent celebrity endorser for brands and products.

Early life and education 
Kriti Kharbanda was born on 29 October 1990 in a Punjabi Hindu family in New Delhi. She has a younger sister Ishita Kharbanda and a younger brother Jaiwardhan Kharbanda, who is the co-founder of Paper Plane Productions. She moved to Bangalore in the early 1990s with her family. After completing her high school in Baldwin Girls' High School, she attended Bishop Cotton Girls' School, ISC, and before graduating from Sri Bhagawan Mahaveer Jain College, a parent institution of Jain University, Bangalore. She holds a diploma in jewellery designing.

According to her, she was very active in cultural activities during school and college.
As a child, she was also featured in a number of advertisements and she continued modelling while in school/college, stating that she "always loved doing TV commercials". Her prominent modelling campaigns during her college days were for Bhima Jewellers, Spar, and Fair & Lovely. Her photo on the Spar billboard caught the attention of NRI director Raj Pippala who was looking for a heroine for his film, and that paved the way for her acting career. She said that she had initially no plans of becoming an actress and that it was only because of her mother's encouragement that she considered it seriously.

Career

Early career (2009–2012) 

After being seen on the Spar billboard, Kharbanda was cast in a lead role for the Telugu film Boni opposite Sumanth. Boni received negative reviews but fetched Kharbanda a positive response. While Sify wrote, "Kriti was a good choice and she had no tense moments despite her debut. Her looks are gorgeous and she has a lot of future if she plays her cards correctly", Rediff.com wrote, "Kriti Kharbanda looks fresh and pretty and manages to play the part of Pragati in a fairly convincing way. She may have to work on her expressions a bit in future, though". Although the film was unsuccessful at the box office, she landed a prominent role in the Pawan Kalyan film Teen Maar. Her next release, however, was her debut Kannada film, Chirru. Her performance was mostly well received, with The Times of India writing that she "excels in her performance" and Indiaglitz.com stating that she "is very pretty and her expressions are good". IANS wrote that she "looks ravishing in song sequences" and "is good at dancing". The film was a hit at the box office in 2010, and Kharbanda stated that it got her recognition and "a fair amount of admiration in the industry", resulting in her being offered numerous projects in Kannada. However, she took a long time to sign her second Kannada film, until October 2011, when she signed up for four films in a single month.

In 2011, she was also seen in a guest role in the successful Telugu romantic comedy Ala Modalaindi, before Teen Maar was released. She appeared in "retro scenes" in Teen Maar in which she had to "replicate heroines from the 70s" and revealed that she also chose the costumes and jewellery she wore in the film. The film turned out to be an average grosser. The following year, she acted in Mr. Nookayya alongside Manoj Manchu in Telugu, and in Prem Adda, a remake of the Tamil film Subramaniapuram, in Kannada. The latter film featured her in a "completely de-glam" role, with the actress stating that her fair complexion posed a problem to her as she played a small town girl from the 80s. She called Girija the most challenging character she had played till then, since it required a no-makeup look, get a tan and walk barefoot to attain "a raw look" like the role demanded. For the film, she also designed her costumes along with her mother.

Career progression (2013–2019) 
Kharbanda had four releases in 2013, two each in Telugu and Kannada. Her first release was Galaate. Times of India said, Kriti gives life to her role. In her Telugu film, Bhaskar's Ongole Githa, opposite Ram Pothineni she played a "typical town girl", Times of India mentioned, "Kriti Kharbanda looks cute and does a decent job of holding her own despite playing a character with little scope to do any acting." Her next release was Kalyan Ram's Om 3D, the first 3D action film in Telugu cinema, both films did not perform well at the box office.

Her career in Kannada, however, saw an upswing with the romantic comedy Googly, co-starring Yash. Her portrayal of a medical student was lauded by critics. Times of India said, "Kriti Kharabanda has given life to her character." Sify, in particular, praised Kharbanda, calling her "The heart and soul of the movie...who emerges triumphant on the big screen with some fine acting". The film went on to collect over 15 crores at the box office, emerging as one of the highest-grossing Kannada films in 2013. She stated that she received a lot of offers after Googly including two Bollywood projects that she had to refuse since she was too busy shooting for her previously signed films.

Kharbanda had three Kannada releases in 2014, her first release Super Ranga co-starred Upendra. Her performance in Super Ranga fetched her positive reviews. Deccan Chronicle wrote, "Kriti, simply adores the screen with her beauty and in the real sense, the beautiful kick for the audience." She won her the Critics' Best Actress Award at the 4th South Indian International Movie Awards as well as her first Filmfare Award nomination for Best Actress. Her next film was Belli, in which she was paired with Shiva Rajkumar, IB Times mentioned that, she is a treat to watch. Her final release of the year was, Tirupati Express, a remake of the Telugu film Venkatadri Express, Deccan Chronicle wrote, "Kriti Kharbanda who has struck hat-trick opportunities after her Googly success, makes another ‘beautiful’ comeback while filling the much needed glamour quotient."

In 2015, she was first paired opposite Diganth in Minchagi Nee Baralu. She received special praise for her performance, with Times of India saying that she's the "biggest plus point of the film". She next portrayed an IAS aspirant in the Telugu film Bruce Lee: The Fighter starring Ram Charan. She received Filmfare Award for Best Supporting Actress – Telugu and SIIMA Award for Best Supporting Actress -Telugu nominations for her performance in the film.

Kharbanda made her Hindi film debut with Raaz Reboot directed by Vikram Bhatt and co-starring Emraan Hashmi. It was her only release of the year. In 2017 she had four release, she first made her tamil debut opposite composer-turned-actor G. V. Prakash Kumar in the film Bruce Lee. It received negative reviews from critics. The same year, she played the lead in Maasthi Gudi a Kannada film, opposite Duniya Vijay.

Kharbanda starred in two Hindi films. Firstly in the comedy drama Guest  London opposite Kartik Aaryan. Firstpost wrote, "Kartik Aryan and Kriti Kharbanda looks good and plays the role well. They've been styled well too." She next portrayed a PCS officer in the romantic comedy Shaadi Mein Zaroor Aana opposite Rajkummar Rao. She received mention for her performance. Bollywood Hungama wrote that she does a much better job here than her previous Hindi releases. Filmfare stated that she gave her career's best performance in the film.Kharbanda had four releases in 2018 too. She first  made a cameo appearance in Karwaan. She next played the lead in the Kannada film Dalapathi starring Nenapirali Prem. Times of India praised her and wrote, "Kriti Kharbanda looks like a million bucks, and one wonders why we don't see her on screen as often in Kannada films, given how she effortlessly charms the audience." Her next releases was Veerey Ki Wedding with Pulkit Samrat. Hindustan Times said that she as Geet is effervescent and pretty, but sadly is limited by a badly written script. She delivers what is expected of her. She then appeared in Yamla Pagla Deewana: Phir Se alongside Bobby Deol. Hindustan Times wrote, "Kriti Kharbanda plays a Gujarati surgeon who loves her booze and should have had her license revoked a long time back."

In 2019, she starred in two cast ensembles. Her first release of the year was the reincarnation comedy Housefull 4, where she portrayed Rajkumari Meena and Neha opposite Deol and Riteish Deshmukh. It became her highest grossing release with a worldwide gross collection of ₹296 crore. Times of India said, "Kriti Kharbanda and Pooja Hegde are reduced to being props, owing to their limited screen time." Hindustan Times praised her, "Kriti Kharbanda brings freshness to the screen" but said, her poor dialogue delivery is distracting. Later that year, she appeared in Anees Bazmee's Pagalpanti alongside Samrat. Bollywood Hungama mentions, "Of all the heroines, Kriti Kharbanda gets to play an interesting character and she does justice."

 Recent work (2020-present) 
Kharbanda's only release in 2020 was Bejoy Nambiar's Taish with Jim Sarbh and Samrat, whichreleased on ZEE5 as a feature film and six-episode series. Bollywood Hungama mentions, "Kriti Kharbanda looks stunning and gives an impressive performance". Times of India mentions, "Kriti Kharbanda, Sanjeeda Sheikh and Saloni Batra play three very different women standing at three crucial junctions in their respective lives. As Arfa, Kharbanda is a sucker for love and the peacemaker of the livid gang."

In 2021, she appeared in ZEE5's 14 Phere, directed by Devanshu Singh opposite Vikrant Massey. The Quint wrote, "Kriti Kharbanda as Aditi, has a very thinly written character sketch, but she manages to be charming throughout." Times of India gave mixed reviews and said, "While Kriti’s screen presence is stunning, especially in the bridal and ethnic attires, she fails to match up to the skilled acting of Vikrant. Even as she tries hard to portray a bold and fearless Jatni, she is stuck with a poker face expression for most parts.

 Personal life 
Kharbanda is dating actor Pulkit Samrat, her co-star from Veerey Ki Wedding, Pagalpanti, and Taish. They have been in a relationship since 2019.

Kharbanda has a keen interest in pole dance and is often seen practicing it. She says, "Pole dance has become a part of not just my fitness, but also my meditation."

 Off-screen work 
Kharbanda decided to sponsor the education for 30 girls through her association with the NGO "Shiksha Seva Foundation", that works at educating girl child, on her 30th birthday in 2020. She has also  worked associated with an NGO that works towards the cause of animals, especially during summer, by providing them water and shelter.

Kharbanda has been associated with Celebrity Cricket League. Since 2011, she has supported "Karnataka Bulldozers" and other teams at the league. All the seasons of the league aim to create awareness about a social issue. In 2022, Kharbanda indulged in an interactive session with actor Chris Hemsworth on "holistic wellbeing". She has ramp walked in the Lakme Fashion Week and has been the cover model for several magazines.

She has been outspoken on issues such as feminism. She said, "We say all are just equals. I believe there cannot be any discrimination between man and woman or that one of them can function without the other. However, I also believe women are stronger in terms of dealing with their emotions."

Controversy
Kharbanda had criticised actress Hina Khan for her comment on "South Indian " actresses. Khan said, "South makers like to cast women who are on the heavier side". On this, Kharbanda lashed out at the actress and said, "Hina Khan is a very big name on television. That is not how you talk about people. There is no need to (say such things on national television). It's rather unfortunate that an actor is talking like that, and an actor of that caliber, that too." She also wanted to slap the actress for her comment.

 Artistry and public image 

Kharbanda has established herself as one of the most popular celebrities in Kannada Cinema. Post her film debut, she was termed "ebullient, beautiful and promising". Following the success of Googly, she became a sought-after actress in Kannada cinema. Kharbanda feels the film "changed her career overnight". She termed it as her favourite and said, "It’s my favourite because I enjoyed working on that film. I felt I could do justice to the character and the character did justice to me." In 2013, she was ranked 8th in Top Sandalwood Actresses List.

On her work style, Kharbanda said that she is "grateful to have reached a position in her career", where she can refuse work that doesn't excite her and "rely on her instincts while choosing characters". On getting typecast, she said,Firstpost find her to be "a perfect blend" of solid acting chops, expressive face, arresting glamour, and a dazzling screen presence. Kharbanda feels Shaadi Mein Zaroor Aana'' is a film that "changed her life". Kharbanda is known to be "extremely detail-oriented", when it comes to her craft.

Kharbanda's rise to popularity resulted in her being voted Bangalore Times Most Desirable Women of 2013. She also ranked 2nd in 2012 and 3rd in 2014 in its 25 Most Desirable Women, and 2nd in 2017's 30 Most Desirable Women List. She is subsequently featured in the Times' 50 Most Desirable Women List. She ranked 32nd in 2017, 37th in 2018, 18th in 2019 and 27th in 2020.

Apart from acting, Kharbanda is an endorser for several brands and products, including Oppo and PC Jeweller. For Oppo, she also shot a short film with Sidharth Malhotra. She is also the brand ambassador of Pebble watches alongside Pulkit Samrat. She has over 7.9 million Instagram followers and is widely known for her fashion style.

Filmography

Films

Television

Accolades

References

External links 
 
 
 

Living people
People from New Delhi
Punjabi people
Actresses from New Delhi
Indian film actresses
21st-century Indian actresses
Actresses in Telugu cinema
Actresses in Kannada cinema
Actresses in Hindi cinema
Actresses in Tamil cinema
1990 births